S. K. Raghunatha Rao (10 November 1922 – 13 December 1991) was an Indian cricket umpire. He stood in seven Test matches between 1961 and 1967.

See also
 List of Test cricket umpires

References

1922 births
1991 deaths
Place of birth missing
Indian Test cricket umpires